Crazy That Way is a 1930 American pre-Code comedy film directed by Hamilton MacFadden and starring Kenneth MacKenna, Joan Bennett and Regis Toomey, and based on the play In Love With Love by Vincent Lawrence.

Cast
 Kenneth MacKenna as Jack Gardner  
 Joan Bennett as Ann Jordan  
 Regis Toomey as Robert Metcalf  
 Jason Robards Sr. as Frank Oakes
 Sharon Lynn as Marion Sars 
 Lumsden Hare as Mr. Jordan

Preservation status
This film is now thought to be a lost film.

See also
List of lost films

References

Bibliography
 Kellow, Brian. The Bennetts: An Acting Family (University Press of Kentucky, 2004)

External links

1930 films
American comedy films
American black-and-white films
1930 comedy films
1930s English-language films
Films directed by Hamilton MacFadden
Fox Film films
1930 lost films
Lost American films
Lost comedy films
1930s American films